Yoohanon Chrysostom Kalloor (born 19 May 1944) was the second bishop of the Eparchy of Marthandom (1998–2010) and first bishop of the Eparchy of Pathanamthitta (2010–2019) of the Syro-Malankara Catholic Church. He retired from Pathanamthitta on 7 June 2019 and was succeeded by Samuel Irenios Kattukallil. He is currently Bishop Emeritus.

Family and education
Kalloor was the third son of Abraham and Achiyamma of the Kalloor family of Kadammanitta, in Pathanamthitta District. He received secondary education at Government High School, Kadammanitta, did minor seminary at St. Aloysius Seminary, Trivandrum, and philosophy and theology at St. Paul's Seminary, Tiruchirappalli (Trichy).

Ministry
Kalloor was ordained a priest by Benedict Mar Gregorios on 5 May 1973. He began pastoral ministry as assistant vicar in the parishes around Balaramapuram. Later he became parochial vicar of Venniyoor, Mulloor, Chowara and Vizhinjam, and later still director of St. Johns Leprosy and HIV Care Services at Pirappancode.

When the Malankara Catholic Mission in North America was inaugurated, Kalloor was appointed co-ordinator and spent time ministering in the Archdiocese of Washington. Based at Holy Comforter-St. Cyprian parish in Washington, DC, he was a chaplain for DC General Hospital and coordinated ministry for Syro-Malankara rite Catholics in the United States. In 1997 he was made chorbishop.

Pope John Paul II appointed Kalloor second bishop of the Eparchy of Marthandom on 16 April 1998. He was ordained a bishop with the name Yoohanon Mar Chrysostom by Archbishop Cyril Mar Baselios at Mar Ivanios Stadium, Trivandrum, on 29 June 1998. He was installed as the bishop of Marthandom on 1 July 1998 at Marthandom Cathedral.

Yoohanon Mar Chrysostom was appointed first bishop of the newly erected Eparchy of Pathanamthitta on 25 January 2010 and enthroned on 20 March 2010. He served until retiring on 7 June 2019.

References

1944 births
Living people
21st-century Eastern Catholic bishops
Syro-Malankara bishops
People from Pathanamthitta district